WMEM may refer to:

 WMEM (FM), a radio station (106.1 FM) licensed to Presque Isle, Maine, United States
 WMEM-TV, a television station (channel 10) licensed to Presque Isle, Maine, United States